Spleen exonuclease (3'-exonuclease, spleen phosphodiesterase, 3'-nucleotide phosphodiesterase, phosphodiesterase II) is an enzyme. This enzyme catalyses the following chemical reaction

Exonucleolytic cleavage in the 5'- to 3'-direction to yield nucleoside 3'-phosphates (exonuclease type b)

This enzyme has a preference for single-stranded substrate.

References

External links 
 

EC 3.1.16